Nelson Mandela (1918−2013) was an anti-apartheid activist and former president of South Africa.

Mandela may also refer to:

Film
Mandela (1987 film), an HBO television film
Mandela (1996 film), a documentary film
Mandela (2021 film), 2021 Indian comedy drama film by Madonne Ashwin
Mandela: Long Walk to Freedom, a 2013 biographical film about Nelson Mandela

Moths
Mandela (moth), a synonym of the moth genus Cryptochrostis in the family Erebidae
Elasmia mandela, a species of moth of the family Notodontidae

Places
Mandela, Rajasthan, a village in Sikar, Rajasthan, India
Mandela, Lazio, a town in Italy
Mandela, Massachusetts, a proposed town in Massachusetts

Other uses
Mandela: The Authorised Biography, a 1999 book by Anthony Sampson
Mandela Trophy, a cricket tournament

People with the surname
 Cedza Mandela (b. 1976), Swazi prince and humanitarian, step-grandson of Nelson Mandela
 Makaziwe Mandela (b. 1954), South African businesswoman, daughter of Nelson Mandela
 Makgatho Mandela, South African lawyer, son of Nelson Mandela
 Mandela family, South African political dynasty
 Mandla Mandela, South African chief and politician, grandson of Nelson Mandela
 Ndaba Mandela, South African humanitarian, grandson of Nelson Mandela
 Ndileka Mandela, South African activist, granddaughter of Nelson Mandela
 Ocansey Mandela, Burkina Faso football player
 Thembekile Mandela, son of Nelson Mandela
 Winnie Madikizela-Mandela (1936-2018), anti-apartheid activist, politician, and ex-wife of Nelson Mandela
 Zenani Mandela-Dlamini, South African diplomat, daughter of Nelson Mandela
 Zindzi Mandela-Hlongwane (1960–2020), South African diplomat, daughter of Nelson Mandela
 Zoleka Mandela, South African writer and activist, granddaughter of Nelson Mandela

Fictional characters
 William Mandella, fictional soldier character introduced in the American novel series The Forever War, specifically in the book A Separate War

People with the given name
 Mandela Barnes (born 1986), American politician
 Mandela Egbo (born 1997), English footballer
 Mandela Kapere (died 2020), Namibian politician
 Mandela Keita (born 2002), Belgian footballer
 Mandela Van Peebles (born 1994), American actor

See also
Mandala (disambiguation)
Mandeliidae, a sea slug family

Xhosa-language surnames